"Poets" is a song by Canadian rock band The Tragically Hip. It was released in June 1998 as the lead single from their sixth studio album, Phantom Power. The song reached number-one on Canada's Alternative chart, and stayed number-one for 12 weeks straight, longer than any song in the history of that chart.

The song was a live staple for the band, and was performed at several of the band's biggest concerts, including their performance at Woodstock 1999, their performance at the Live 8 concert in 2005 (with Dan Aykroyd playing harmonica), and their farewell show in 2016.

Charts

References

External links

1998 singles
The Tragically Hip songs